is a railway station on the Minobu Line of Central Japan Railway Company (JR Central) located in the city of Fujinomiya, Shizuoka Prefecture, Japan. It is located next to a large factory of the Oji Specialty Paper Co., Ltd.

Lines
Shibakawa Station is served by the Minobu Line and is located 19.2 kilometers from the southern terminus of the line at Fuji Station.

Layout
Shibakawa Station has one island platform serving two tracks, with a third track on a headshunt to permit passage of express trains. The station building has automated ticket machines, automated turnstiles and is unmanned.

Platforms

Adjacent stations

History
Shibakawa Station was opened on March 1, 1915, as a terminal station of the original Fuji-Minobu Line for both passenger and freight services. The line was extended past Shibukawa by 1918. It came under control of the Japanese Government Railways on May 1, 1941. The JGR became the JNR (Japan National Railway) after World War II.  Along with the division and privatization of JNR on April 1, 1987, the station came under the control and operation of the Central Japan Railway Company. Operations by the limited express Fujikawa were discontinued in 1995. From 1998, the station building has been unattended. A new station building was completed in 2012.

Passenger statistics
In fiscal 2017, the station was used by an average of 159 passengers daily (boarding passengers only).

Surrounding area
 Fuji River

See also
 List of railway stations in Japan

References

External links

  Minobu Line station information	

Railway stations in Japan opened in 1915
Railway stations in Shizuoka Prefecture
Minobu Line
Fujinomiya, Shizuoka